Vyazma pryanik is a type of Russian pryanik from the city of Vyazma.

History
In the 19th century, eight gingerbread factories operated in Vyazma.

In 1913, during the celebration of the 300th anniversary of the Romanov dynasty, the merchants from Vyazma gave Nicholai II a giant Vyazma pryanik weighing 16 kilograms (one pood).

In literature
The pryanik is mentioned in The History of a Town by Saltykov-Shchedrin, Chekhov's The Steppe and other works of Russian writers. Alexander Pushkin said: "Moscow is famous for its brides, like Vyazma for its pryaniks".

See also
 Tula pryanik

References

Russian Regional Food Specialties
Russian desserts
Russian inventions
Confectionery
National dishes